At the 1928 Summer Olympics in Amsterdam, 27 athletics events were contested. The competition was held on a 400-meter track and would become the standard for athletics tracks in the future. For the first time, women's events in athletics were included in the Olympic Games program.  There was a total of 706 participants from 40 countries competing.

Medal summary

Men

Women

Records broken
During the 1928 Summer Olympic Games 9 new world records were set in the athletics events. New Olympic records were set in 16 of the 27 events.

Men's world records

Women's world records

Participating nations
706 athletes from 40 nations competed.  Lithuania and Romania competed in athletics for the first time. Bulgaria, Egypt, Malta, Panama, Rhodesia, and Uruguay were the only six nations not to compete in athletics.

References
1928 Summer Olympics results: athletics, from https://www.sports-reference.com/; retrieved 2010-03-01.
 Official Olympic Report

 
1928 Summer Olympics events
1928
International athletics competitions hosted by the Netherlands